Second Corinth order of battle may refer to:

Second Corinth Confederate order of battle
Second Corinth Union order of battle